SS Northenden was a passenger and cargo vessel built for the Manchester, Sheffield and Lincolnshire Railway in 1886.

History

The ship was built by Swan Hunter and launched on 1 May 1886. She arrived for service in Grimsby on 9 June 1886.  She was built for the passenger a freight trade between Grimsby and Hamburg. She was the second of an order of two ships from Swan Hunter, the other being . She was named after the town where the chairman of the company, Sir Edward Watkin, 1st Baronet resided.

In 1897 she was acquired by the Great Central Railway. She was sold in 1909 to the Progress Company of West Hartlepool. In 1910 they sold her to S Atychides & Th B Vahratoglu of Istanbul and she was renamed Uhuvet and then in 1911 renamed Selâmet. In 1912 she was sold to the Cie Perso-Ottomane de Nav a Vapeur in Bandar Abbas and renamed Ispahan. A new owner in 1914, Levazim Isleri Dairesi in Constantinople, renamed her Isfahan. The Ottoman Navy refloated her on 17 October 1915, and she was beached. She was sold for breaking in 1919.

References

1886 ships
Steamships of the United Kingdom
Ships built on the River Tyne
Ships of the Manchester, Sheffield and Lincolnshire Railway
Ships of the Great Central Railway
Maritime incidents in 1915
World War I shipwrecks in the Mediterranean Sea